Platt, or St. Mary's Platt is a village and civil parish in the local government district of Tonbridge and Malling in Kent, England.

The hamlet of Crouch (pronounced Crooch) lies within the parish. The River Bourne flows through the western part of the parish. Basted paper mill was within the parish boundary.

The Anglican parish church of St Mary's dates from 1843 and stands on a hill overlooking the village centre. The architects were Whichcord and Walker of Maidstone.

BBC broadcaster Adam Curtis grew up in Platt.

Interment 
Richard Hearne is buried in the churchyard. He was an actor, who lived at Platt Farm, a fifteenth-century property in Long Mill Lane in the village, from the 1940s, from where he ran a market garden.

Nearest settlements

References

External links

 Platt Memorial Hall
 Platt War Memorial
 Platt Parish Council

Villages in Kent
Civil parishes in Kent
Tonbridge and Malling